Twistane (IUPAC name: tricyclo[4.4.0.03,8]decane) is an organic compound with the formula C10H16. It is a cycloalkane and an isomer of the simplest diamondoid, adamantane, and like adamantane, is not very volatile. Twistane was named for the way its rings are permanently forced into the cyclohexane conformation known as the "twist-boat". The compound was first reported by Whitlock in 1962.

Synthesis
Twistane has been synthesized in a variety of ways. The original 1962 method was based on a bicyclo[2.2.2]octane framework. A 1967 publication concerned an intramolecular aldol condensation of a cis-decalin diketone. It is formed when basketane is hydrogenated.

Symmetry
The only symmetry operation in twistane is rotation, and there exist three 2-fold axes as shown in the left picture. Thus the point group of twistane is D2.
Although twistane has four stereocenters, it only exists as two enantiomers. This is because it is symmetric along its C2 axis.

Polytwistane
Polytwistane is a hypothetical polymer of fused twistane units awaiting actual synthesis.

References

Polycyclic nonaromatic hydrocarbons
Tricyclic compounds